The 2003–04 Marquette Warriors men's basketball team represented Marquette University during the 2003–04 college basketball season.

Schedule

|-
!colspan=9 style=| Conference USA tournament

|-
!colspan=9 style=| NIT

References 

Marquette Golden Eagles men's basketball seasons
Marquette
Marquette
Marquette
Marquette